Rauza Sharif Mandhali Darbar is a Sufiyana Darbar shrine located in Mandhali village, nearby Phagwara, Punjab, India.

The Darbar or known as Roza is a Sufi Muslim place of worship. People from different castes and religions come to pay their respects. This Rauza is a Sufi Muslim Dargah. There is an old story that with the miracle of Baba Abdullah Shah Qadri the train started to stop in the village, Kultham. That is why the railway station is called "Baba Abdulla Shah Kadri Railway Station Kultham" to this day. After Baba Abdullah Shah the Roza was looked after by Baba Fateh Shah, Baba Gulami Shah, Data Ali Ahmed Shah and Baba Nur Shah.
There are three melas that are held every year which are led under the guidance of Umre Shah Qadri. There is a urs mela (Death anniversary) of Baba Abdullah Shah Qadri which is held for 5 days which takes place on 29 June to 3 July. There is also a three-day urs Mela (Death anniversary) of Data Ali Ahmed Shah Qadri which is held on 12 December to 14 December. The third Mela is held at Banga Darbar (Shrine of Baba Gulami Shah, Banga) which is held for three days on 12 September to 14 September. Various singers and qawwals perform during these melas. Many singers such as Kuldeep Manak, Hans Raj Hans, Gurdas Maan, Sardool Sikander, Jazzy B, Lakhwinder Wadali, Balwinder Safri, Nooran Sisters, Buta Mohammad, Sabar Koti, Master Saleem, Masha Ali and Feroz Khan have performed. Many qawwals such as Munawar Ali Shafi Taqi, Hamsar Hayat, Sardar Ali, Shakeel Sabri, Karamat Ali Fakeer, Shaulat Ali Matoi and many more also perform.

About
The Rauza Mandhali Sharif Darbar is a Sufi shrine located in Mandhali village and is also known as the Makkah of Punjab. This pilgrimage site consists of the main tomb belonging to Baba Abdullah Shah Qadri. Hazrat came from Saudi Arabia, settled in Punjab and is now buried in Mandhali Sharif. Data Ali Ahmed Shah Qadri, Bibi Karma, Sai Bhajan Shah Qadri and Sai Gulam Baqi Bille Shah Qadri are also buried in the complex of the Rauza, along with graves of other sewadars of the Rauza in the complex.
Gaddi Nashin:
 Sayed ul Shaykh Hazrat Baba Abdullah Shah Qadri
 Data Ali Ahmed Shah Qadri
 Sai Bhajan Shah Qadri
 Sai Gulam Baqi Bille Shah Qadri
 Sai Umre Shah Qadri(Present)

Data Ali Ahmed Shah Qadri was the maternal uncle and guru of Baba Bhajan Shah Qadri. Sai Bhajan Shah Qadri was visited by a westerner who was an author, Hugh Johnston who described as a 'good looking man... wearing an elaborately embroidered, full length black and golden kaftan.' Baba Bhajan Shah Qadri was well known for his long shoulder-length hair and had an enchanting face.

Thursday is the most crowded day to visit this shrine as it is considered a special day within Sufism.

History
During the partition of India (1947), most of the sewadars of the Darbar settled in Pakistan. There is a twin Darbar in Pakistan which also has the name Mandhali Sharif Darbar. Before partition, Sai Kaly Shah and Data Ali Ahmed looked after the Sangat that attended the Darbar. Sai Kaly Shah settled in Pakistan while Data Ali Ahmed stayed in Mandhali and continued to look after the Rauza. After Data Ali Ahmed Shah Qadri's unexpected death, Sai Bhajan Shah Qadri became gaddi nashin of the darbar in 1985.

Sai Umre Shah Qadri is the current gaddi nashin of the Darbar. Lakhwinder Wadali is also a disciple of Sai and attends the Darbar frequently and often does Sewa at the darbar.

References

Sufi shrines in India
Jalandhar district
Sufism in Punjab, India
Religious buildings and structures in Punjab, India